The Staffelsee is a lake in the Garmisch-Partenkirchen district of Bavaria, Germany. The settlements of Murnau, Seehausen and Uffing lie on its shores. Within its  area lie seven islands, the largest and only inhabited of which is Wörth. 
Wörth was the site of Staffelsee Abbey, a Carolingian monastery founded in the 8th century and dissolved in the 11th century.

Boat trips aboard the MS Seehausen (built 2009) connect the landing stages of Seehausen, Uffing and Achele (Murnau) between April and October.

The main inflow and outflow of the lake is the River Ach, which enters from the west and departs to the north.

The northeastern part of the lake is known as Untersee, the southeastern part as Stegsee and the southwestern part as Obersee (see map below).

References

Lakes of Bavaria
Garmisch-Partenkirchen (district)